William Preston (October 16, 1816 – September 21, 1887) was an American lawyer, politician, and ambassador. He also was a brigadier general in the Confederate Army during the American Civil War.

Biography
Preston, the grandson of Col. William Preston—the namesake of Prestonville, Kentucky—was born in Louisville, Kentucky. Francis Preston was his uncle. His sister Henrietta married Albert S. Johnston in 1829. He pursued preparatory studies and graduated from St. Joseph's College in Kentucky. He attended Yale College in 1835 and graduated from the law department of Harvard University in 1838. After graduation from Harvard, Preston was admitted to the bar and commenced practice in Louisville in 1839.

He served as lieutenant colonel of the 4th Kentucky Volunteers in the Mexican–American War from 1847 to 1848. After the war, he was a delegate to the State constitutional convention in 1849 and a member of the Kentucky House of Representatives in 1850. Subsequently, he served in the State senate 1851–1853. He was elected as a Whig to the Thirty-second Congress to fill the vacancy caused by the resignation of Humphrey Marshall and reelected to the Thirty-third Congress and served from December 6, 1852, to March 3, 1855. He stood again for another term in 1854 but was unsuccessful. President James Buchanan appointed Preston as Envoy Extraordinary and Minister Plenipotentiary to Spain in 1858. He resigned as ambassador in 1861 at the outbreak of the Civil War.

Although his home state of Kentucky did not secede from the Union, Preston would serve the South. In November 1861, the provisional government for Kentucky appointed he, Henry C. Burnett and William E. Simms as commissioners to treat with the Confederates States government for the admission of Kentucky into the Confederacy.  Shortly thereafter, Preston was made a colonel and became volunteer aide-de-camp to his brother-in-law, Albert Sidney Johnston, who then had his Army of Central Kentucky quartered at Bowling Green.

Preston subsequently attained the rank of brigadier general in 1862. He was appointed Envoy Extraordinary and Minister Plenipotentiary from the Confederacy to Maximilian, Emperor of Mexico in 1864.

After the war, he again served as a member of the Kentucky State House of Representatives in 1868 and 1869.

William Preston died in Louisville and was interred in Cave Hill Cemetery in Louisville.

See also

List of American Civil War generals (Confederate)

References

 Eicher, John H., and David J. Eicher, Civil War High Commands. Stanford: Stanford University Press, 2001. .
 Sifakis, Stewart. Who Was Who in the Civil War. New York: Facts On File, 1988. .
 Warner, Ezra J. Generals in Gray: Lives of the Confederate Commanders. Baton Rouge: Louisiana State University Press, 1959. .
 Biographical Directory of the United States Congress

External links
Guide to Wickliffe-Preston family papers, 1770-1887 housed at the University of Kentucky Libraries Special Collections Research Center

Military personnel from Louisville, Kentucky
Members of the Kentucky House of Representatives
Ambassadors of the United States to Spain
Confederate States of America diplomats
19th-century American diplomats
Yale University alumni
Harvard Law School alumni
Confederate States Army brigadier generals
People of Kentucky in the American Civil War
Politicians from Louisville, Kentucky
1816 births
1887 deaths
American military personnel of the Mexican–American War
Members of the Aztec Club of 1847
Burials at Cave Hill Cemetery
Whig Party members of the United States House of Representatives from Kentucky
19th-century American politicians
Preston family of Virginia